This is a list of diplomatic missions in Tonga. There are currently 5 diplomatic missions in Nukualofa, (not including honorary consulates).

Embassies/High Commissions in Nuku’alofa

Gallery

Non-Resident Embassies/High Commissions

Resident in Canberra, Australia

Resident in Suva, Fiji

Resident in Tokyo, Japan

Resident in Wellington, New Zealand

See also
 Foreign relations of Tonga
 List of diplomatic missions of Tonga

References

External links
Government of Tonga

Foreign relations of Tonga
Tonga
Diplomatic missions